Downtown Lawrenceburg Historic District is a national historic district located at Lawrenceburg, Dearborn County, Indiana.  The district encompasses 257 contributing buildings and 2 contributing objects in the central business district and surrounding residential sections of Lawrenceburg. The district developed between about 1815 and 1900, and includes notable examples of Late Victorian, Federal, and Greek Revival style architecture.  Located in the district are the separately listed Dearborn County Courthouse and Hamline Chapel United Methodist Church.  Other notable buildings include the Trade and Industrial Building (1881), Lawrenceburg Theater (1875), Jesse Hunt Hotel (1818), the birthplaces of James B. Eads and Louis Skidmore.

It was added to the National Register of Historic Places in 1984.

References

External links

Historic districts on the National Register of Historic Places in Indiana
Victorian architecture in Indiana
Federal architecture in Indiana
Greek Revival architecture in Indiana
Historic districts in Dearborn County, Indiana
National Register of Historic Places in Dearborn County, Indiana